The pointed-headed sphenomorphus (Sphenomorphus acutus)  is a species of skink found in the Philippines.

References

acutus
Reptiles described in 1864
Taxa named by Wilhelm Peters
Reptiles of the Philippines